The Chamak copper plates are an epigraphic record of the Vākāṭaka dynasty, documenting a land donation to brāhmaṇas in the reign of king Pravarasena II in the fifth century CE. They were found at Chamak, in District Amravati, Maharashtra, India.

Location
Chamak or Chammak is located 6.0 miles SW of Acalpur according to Amravati district Gazetteer published by the Government of Maharashtra. According to J. F. Fleet the village is four miles s. w. of Ilichpur (Ellichpur). This is the old name for Achalpur. Chamak currently consists of a cluster of three villages on the banks of the Chandrabhāgā river with those on the eastern bank known as Chamak Khurd and Chamak Buzurg. The plates were found in a field near the village in the 19th century and were acquired by Major H. Szczepanski. They are now in the collection of the British Library registered under the number Ind. Ch. no. 16.

Publication
The Chamak copper-plate charter was read and published by John Faithfull Fleet in 1888. The record was subsequently published by V. V. Mirashi in 1963.

Description and Contents
The Chamak charter consists of a series of copper plates linked together with a ring held with a seal. The text of the inscription is Sanskrit throughout. The object of the inscription is to record the grant, by Pravarasena II, of the village Charmāka situated on the bank of the Madhunadī in the rājya of Bhojakaṭa. The grant consisted of 8000 bhūmi-s by the royal measure. The donees were a "thousand Brāhmaṇas", although only 49 are actually named. The grant was made at the request of Koṇḍarāja, the son of Śatrughnarāja. This Koṇḍarāja is also mentioned in line 45 of the Pattan copper plates. The grant is dated on the thirteenth tithi of the bright fortnight of Jyeṣṭha in the 18th regnal year. The senāpati was Citravarman. From the Belorā copper plates, Set B, we know that Citravarman was holding the same post seven years earlier in the 11th regnal year of Pravarasena II.

Metrics
The seal carries a verse in anuṣṭubh metre.

Text

Seal:

1) Vākāṭaka-lalāmasya
2) kkra(kra)ma-prāpta-nṛpaśriyaḥ [|*]
3) rājñaḥ Pravarasenasya
4) śāsanaṃ ripuśāsanaṃ[||*]

First plate.

1) dṛṣṭaṃ [||*] svasti [|*] pravarapurād-agniṣṭom-āptoryyām-okthya-ṣoḍaśy-ātirātra-
2) vājapeya-bṛhaspatisava-sādyaskra-caturaśvamedha-yājinaḥ
3) r-Viṣṇuvṛddha-sagotrasya samrā[ḍ] Vākāṭakānāṃ mahārāja-śṛ (read: śrī)-Pravarasenasya
4) sūnoḥ sūnoḥ atyanta-[s]vāmi-mahābhairava-bhaktasya a[*ṃ]sabhāra-santi(nni)veśi-
5) ta-śivali[ṅgo]dvahana-śiva-suparituṣṭa-samutpādi[ta]-rājava(vaṃ)śā-

Second plate : First side.

6) nām-parākram-ādhigata-Bhāgīratthyā(tthya)-mala-jala-mūrdrdhnā(rddh-ā)bhiṣiktānān-daś-ā-
7) śvamedh-āvabhṛtha-snātānām-Bhāraśivānāṃ mahārāja-śrī-Bhavanāga-dau-
8) hitrasya Gautamīputrasya putrasya Vākāṭakānāṃ mahārāja-śrī-Rudrase-
9) nasya sūnor-atyatna(nta)-māheśvarasya satyārjjava-kāruṇya-śauryya-vikkramana-
10) ya-vinaya-māhātmyā(tmya)-dhi(dhī)matva(ttva) hā(pā)trā(tra)gata-bhaktī(kti)tva-dharmmavī(vi)jayī(yi)tva-

Second plate : Second side.

11) mano-nairmmā(rmma)ly-ādiguṇais-samupetasya varṣaśatam-abhivarddhamāna-kośa-
12) daṇḍa-sādhana-sannā(ntā)na-putra-pautriṇaḥ Yyudhiṣṭhira-vṛtne(tte)r-Vvākāṭakā-
13) nāṃ mahārāja-śrī-Pṛthiviṣeṇasya sūnor-bbhagavataś-cakkrapāṇeḥ prasā-
14) d-opārjjita-śrī-samudayasya Vākāṭakānāṃ mahārāja-śrī-Rudrasena-
15) [sya] sūnor-mmahārājādhirāja-śrī-Devagupta-sutāyāṃ Prabhāva-

Third plate : First side.

16) tiguptāyām-utpanta(nna)sya śambhoḥ prasāda-dhṛti(ta)-kārttayugasya
17) Vākāṭakānām-paramamāheśvara-mahārāja-śrī-Pravarasenasya vacanā[t*]
18) Bhojakaṭa-rājye Madhu-nadī-taṭe Carmmāṅka-nāma-gra(grā)maḥ rājamānika-bhu(bhū)mi-
19) sahasrair-aṣṭābhiḥ 8000 śśatra(tru)ghna-rājaputra-Koṇḍarāja-vijñā(jña)ptyā nānāgo-
20) tra-caraṇebhyo brāmhaṇebhyaḥ sahasrāya dattaḥ [|*]

Third plate : Second side.

21) yatosmat-santakā[ḥ*]-sarvvāddhyakṣ-ādhiyoga-niyuktā ājñā-sañca(ñcā)ri-kulaputr-ādhikṛtā
22) bhaṭā-cchā(śchā)trāś-ca viśruta-pūrvva-yājñay-ājñāpayitavyā viditam-astu vo yathe-
23) h-āsmā-kammano dharmm-āyur-bbala-vijay-aiśvaryya-vivṛddhaye ih-āmutra-hitā-
24) rttham-ātm-ānugrahāya vaijai(jayi)ke dharmmasthāne apūrvvadatyā(ttya) udaka-pūrvva-
25) m-atisṛṣṭaḥ [|*] ath-āsy-ocitāṃ pūrvvarāj-ānumatāṃ cāturvaidya-grāma-ma
26) ryyādān-vitarāmas-tad-yathā akaradāyī abhaṭa-ccha(cchā)tra-prāveśya[ḥ*]

Fourth plate : First side.

27) apārampara-gobalivardda[ḥ*] apumpa(ṣpa)-kṣīra sandoha[ḥ*]-aca(cā)rā-
28) sanacarmm-āṅgāra[ḥ*] alavaṇa-klinna-kreṇi-khanaka[ḥ*] sarvva-veṣṭi-pari-
29) hāra-parīhṛtaḥ sanidhi-ssopanidhiḥ saklipt-opakliptaḥ
30) ācandr-āditya-kālīyaḥ putra-pautr-a(tr-ā)nugamikaḥ bhuja(ñja)tāṃ na ke-
31) nacid-vyāghātaṃ(taḥ) kartavya-ssarvvakriy-ābhissaṃrakṣitavyaḥ para(ri)varddhayi-
32) tava(vya)ś-ca [|*] yaś-c-āyaṃ śāsanam-agaṇayamāno(naḥ) svalpa(lpā)m-api [pa*]ribādhāṃ-

Fourth plate : Second side.

33) nku(ku)ryyāt-kārayitā vā tasya brāhmaṇair-vveditasya sava(da)ṇḍa-nigrahaṃ kuryyā-
34) m || asmi(smiṃ)ś-ca dharmmāva(da)ra-karaṇe ati(tī)t-ānekarāja-datna(tta)-sañcitna(nta) na-
35) paripālanaṃ kṛta-puṇy-ānukīrttana-parihār-ārtthaṃ na kīrttayāmaḥ [|*]
36) Vyāsagītau c-ātra ślokau pramāni(ṇī) karttavyau [|*] svadatnā(ttā)m-paradatna(ttāṃ)
37) vvā(vā) yo hareta vasundharāṃ(ram) | gavāṃ śatasahasrasya hattu(ntu)-

Fifth plate : First side.

38) r-harati duṣkṛtaṃ(tam) [||1||*] ṣaṣṭiṃ varṣa-sahasrāni(ṇi) svargge modati bhū-
39) midaḥ[|*] ācchettā c-ānumantā ca tānyeva narake vased-iti [||2||*] śśā(śā)sana-
40) sthitiś-c-eyaṃ brāhmaṇair-īśvaraiś-c-ānupālanīyā [|*] tad-yathā rājñāṃ sa-
41) ptāṅge rājye adroha-pravṛnta(ttā)nāṃ [a*]brahmagna-caurā(ra)-pāradārika-rājā-
42) patthy-akāriprabhṛti(tī)nāṃ saṃgra(grā)ma[m*] kurvvatāṃ anyagrāma(m-e)ṣvana-||

Fifth plate : Second side.

43) para(rā)ddhānāṃ ācandr-āditya-kālīyaḥ[|*] atonyathā kurvvatām-anumodatāṃ vā
44) rājñaḥ bhūmicchedaṃ kurvvantaḥ(taḥ) asteyam-iti [|*] prā(pra)ti[grā]hiṇaś-c-ātra
45) vāraniyuttā(ktāḥ)[|*] śāṭyāyanaḥ Gaṇāryyaḥ Vātsyadevāryyaḥ Bhāradvāja-
46) Kumāra-śarmmāryya[ḥ*]-Pārāśaryya-Guhaśarmmā Kāśyapa-Deva(vā)ryyaḥ Maheśvarāryya[ḥ*]
47) Mātrāryyaḥ Koṇḍiṇya(nya)-Rudrāryya[ḥ*] Somāryya[ḥ*] Hariśarmmāryya[ḥ*]

Sixth plate : First side:

48) Bhāradvāja-Kumāraśa[rmmā]ryya[ḥ*] Kauṇḍiṇya(nya)-Mā[tṛ]śarmmā Varaśarmmā
49) Goṇḍaśarmmā Nāgaśarmmā Bhāradvā[ja*]-śāntiśarmmā Rudraśarmmā Vātsyaḥ
50) Bhojaka-Da(de)vāryya[ḥ*] Maghaśarmmā Devaśarmmā Bhāradvāja-Mokṣaśarmmā
51) [Nā]gaśarmmā Revatiśarmmā Dharmmāryya[ḥ*] Bhāradvāja-śarmmāryya[ḥ*]
52) Nandanāryya Mūlaśarmmā īśvaraśarmmā Varaśarmmā

Sixth plate : Second side.

53) Vānsya-Skandāryya[ḥ*] Bhāradvāja-Bappāryya[ḥ*] Dharmmāryya[ḥ*] ātreya-Skandāryya[ḥ*]
54) Gautama-Somaśarmmāryya[ḥ*] Bhatṛ(rtṛ)śarmmā[ḥ*] Rudraśa[rmmā]ryya Maghāryya[ḥ*] Mātṛ-
55) śarmmāryya[ḥ*] īśvaraśarmmāryya[ḥ*]-Gautama-sagotra-Mātṛśarmmā-
56) ryya[ḥ*]-Kauṇḍiṇya(nya)-Devaśarmmāryya[ḥ*] Varaśarmmāryya[ḥ*] Rohāryya[ḥ*]

Seventh plate.

57) Gautama-sagotra-Svāmide[vā]ryya[ḥ*]-Revatiśarmmāryya[ḥ*]
58) Jyeṣṭhaśarmmāryya[ḥ*] śāṇḍilya-Kumāraśarmmāryya[ḥ*] Svātiśarmmā-
59) ryya śa(śā)ṭyāyana-Kāṇḍa(ṇḍā)ryya-prabhṛtayaḥ [|*] senāpatau
60) Citravarmmaṇi saṃvvatsar-eṣṭādaśa(śe) 10 8 Jyeṣṭhamāsa-śukla-
61) pakṣa-trayodaśyā(śyāṃ)-śāsanaṃ likhitam-iti ||

__

Commentaries and variants.

L.1 Read ṣoḍaśy-atirātra-. (Mi.)
L.3 Read Viṣṇuvṛddha; Mi. read samrājo.
L.10 Fleet proposed to read māhātmyādhikatva, but it gives no good sense. The Paṭṭan plates(No. 13) give dhīmattva in line 11.
L.14 Engraver at first write jji, then correct to rjji. (Mi.)
L.18 Engraver at first write ṅkā, then correct to ṅka. (Mi.)
L.23 Read yath-eh-āsmābhir-ātmano. (Mi.)
L.26 Read -maryyādāṃ vitarāma-; Engraver at first wrote dāyai, then correct to dāyī. (Mi.)
L.28 Read viṣṭi-. (Mi.)
L.29 Read parihṛtaḥ; sakлptopakлiptaḥ. (Mi.)
L.32 Read yaścedaṃ or yaścāsmacchāsanaṃ as in No.13. l.35; after [pa*]ribādhāṃ - kuryyā engraved, then cancelled. (Mi.)
L.33 Read kārayedvā. (Mi.)
L.36 The sign of upadhmānīya after pramāni(ṇī) is cancelled. (Mi.)
L.39 Originally ccha, later corrected into ca. (Mi.)
L.42 To ṣvana-|| - this punctuation mark must be omitted. (Mi.)
L.43 Originally vvā, later corrected into vā. (Mi.)
L.44 To prā(pra)ti[grā]hiṇaś- : originally gvā, later corrected into grā. (Mi.)
L.46 To Maheśvarāryya[ḥ*]: this -ryya incised below rā of maheśvarā. (Mi.)
L.53 To Vānsya-: read vātsya. (Mi.)

Translation
Seal.
A charter of king Pravarasêna, the ornament of the Vâkâtakas, who has attained royal dignity by, inheritance, (is) a charter for (the observance of even his) enemies!
Plates.
Sight has been attained! Hail! From the town of Pravarapura;
(Line 17.)-At the command of the most devout worshipper of (the god) Mahêshvara, the Mahârâja of the Vâkâtakas, the illustrious Pravarasêna (II.), who was begotten on Prabhâvatiguptâ, the daughter of the Mahârâjadhirâja, the glorious Dêvagupta; who, through possessing the favour of (the god) Shambhu, is (as virtuous as) one belonging to the Krita age;-
(Line 13.) -(And) who is the son of the Mahârâja of the Vâkâtakas, the illustrious Rudrasêna (II.), who acquired an abundance of good fortune through the favour of the divine (god) Chakrapâni;
(L. 9.)-Who was the son of the Mahârâja of the Vâkâtakas, the illustrious Prithivishêna, who was an excessively devout worshipper of (the god) Mahêshvara; who was endowed with an excess of truthfulness, straightforwardness, tenderness, heroism, prowess, political wisdom, modesty, and high-mindedness, and with devotion to worthy people and guests, and with the condition of being victorious through religion, and with purity of mind, and with other meritorious qualities; who belonged to an uninterrupted succession of sons and sons' sons, whose treasure and means of government had been accumulating for a hundred years; who behaved like Yudhishthira;-
(L. 4.)-Who was the son of the Mahârâja of the Vâkâtakas, the illustrious Rudrasêna (I.), who was an excessively devout devotee of (the god) Svâmi-Mahâbhairava; who was the daughter's son of the illustrious Bhavanâga, the Mahârâja of the Bhârashivas, whose royal line owed its origin to the great satisfaction of (the god) Shiva, (caused) by (their) carrying a linga of Shiva placed as a load upon (their) shoulders, (and) who were besprinkled on the forehead with the pure water of (the river) Bhâgirathî that had been obtained by (their) valour, (and) who performed ablutions after the celebration of ten ashvamêdha-sacrifices;-who was the son of Gautamiputra;-
(L. 1.)-(And) who was the son of the son of the Mahârâja of the sovereign Vâkâtakas, the illustrious Pravarasêna (I.), who celebrated the agnishtôma, aptôryâma,
ukthya, shôdashin, âtirâtra, vâjapêya, brihaspatisava, and sâdyaskra sacrifices and four ashvamêdha-sacrifices, (and) was of the Vishnuvriddha gôtra;-
(L. 18.)-The village named Charmânika, on the bank of the river Madhunadi, in the Bhôjakata kingdom, (measured) by eight thousand bhûmis, (or in figures) 8000, according to the royal measure, is, at the request of Kondarâja the son of Satrughnarâja, given to one thousand Brâhmans of various gôtras and charanas.
(L. 21.)-Wherefore Our obedient and high-born officers, employed in the office of general superintendents, (and Our) regular soldiers and umbrella-bearers, should be (thus) directed with a command preceded by (the words) ‘O illustrious one’:- Be it known to you, that, in order to increase Our religion and life and strength and victory and dominion, (and) for the sake of (Our) welfare in this world and in the next, (and generally) for Our benefit, this (village) is granted, in (Our) victorious office of justice, as a grant not previously made, with libations of water.
(L. 25.)- "Now We grant the fixed usage, such as befits this (village), (and) such as has been approved of by former kings, of a village which belongs to a community of Chaturvêdins; namely, it is not to pay taxes; it is not to be entered by the regular troops or by the umbrella-bearers; it does not carry with it (the right to) cows and bulls in succession of production, or to the abundance of flowers and milk, or to the pasturage, hides, and charcoal, or to the mines for the purchase of salt in a moist state; it is entirely free from (all obligation of) forced labour; it carries with it the hidden treasures and deposits, and the klripta and upaklripta; it is (to be enjoyed) for the same time with the moon and the sun; (and) it is to follow (the succession of) sons and sons' sons. No hindrance should be caused by any one to those who enjoy it. It should be protected and increased by all (possible) means. And whosoever, disregarding this charter, shall give, or cause to be given, even slight vexation, We will inflict on him punishment, together with a fine, when he is denounced by the Brâhmans."
(L. 34.)-And in this document, which has at least (the merit of) religion,-in order to avoid boasting of (other) meritorious actions performed (by Us),--We do not recite (Our) care and protection of grants made by various kings who are dead and gone.
(L. 36.)-And two verses, sung by Vyâsa, are to be cited as an authority on this point: -Whosoever confiscates land that has been given, whether by himself, or by another, he incurs the guilt of the slayer of a hundred thousand cows! The giver of land enjoys happiness in heaven for sixty thousand years; (but) the confiscator (of a grant), and he who assents (to an act of confiscation), shall dwell for the same number of years in hell!
(L. 39.)-And this condition of the charter should be maintained by the Brâhmans and by (future) lords; namely (the enjoyment of this grant is to belong to the Brâhmans) for the same time with the moon and the sun, provided that they commit no treason against the kingdom, consisting of seven constituent parts, of (successive) kings; that they are not slayers of Brâhmans, and are not thieves, adulterers, poisoners of kings, &c.; that they do
not wage war; (and) that they do no wrong to other villages. But, if they act otherwise, or assent (to such acts), the king will commit no theft in taking the land away.
(L. 44.)-And the recipients, appointed for the occasion in this matter, (are): Ganârya, of the Shâtyâyana (gôtra). Dêvârya, of the Vâtsya (gôtra). Kumârasharmârya, of the Bhâradvâja (gôtra). Guhasharman, of the Pârâsharya (gôtra). Dêvârya, of the Kâshyapa (gôtra); Mahêshvarârya, (and) Mâtrârya. Rudrârya, of the Kaundinya (gôtra); (and) Sômârya, (and) Harisharmârya. Kumârasharmârya, of the Bhâradvâja (gôtra). Mâtrisharman, of the Kaundinya (gôtra); (and) Varasharman, Gôndasharman, (and) Nâgasharman. Shântisharman, of the Bhâradvâja (gôtra); (and) Rudrasharman, Bhôjakadêvârya, of the Vâtsya (gôtra); (and) Maghasharman, (and) Dêvasharman. Môkshasharman, of the Bhâradvâja (gôtra); (and) Nâgasharman, Rêvatisharman, (and) Dharmârya, Sharmârya, of the Bhâradvâja (gôtra); (and) Nandanârya, Mûlasharman, Îshvarasharman, (and) Varasharman. Skandârya, of the Vâtsya (gôtra). Bappârya, of the Bhâradvâja (gôtra); (and) Dharmârya. Skandârya, of the Âtrêya (gôtra), Sômasharmârya, of the Gautama (gôtra); (and) Bhartrisharman, Rudrasharmârya, Maghârya, Mâtrisharmârya, (and) Îshvarasharmârya. Mâtrisharmârya, of the Gautama (gôtra). Dêvasharmârya, of the Kaundinya (gôtra); (and) Varasharmârya, (and) Rôhârya. Svâmidêvârya, of the Gautama (gôtra); (and) Rêvatisharmârya, (and) Jyêshthasharmârya. Kumârasharmârya, of the Shândilya (gôtra); (and) Svâtisharmârya. (And) Kândârya, of the Shâtyâyana (gôtra); and so forth.
(L. 59.)-(This) charter has been written, while Chitravarman is the Sênâpati, in the eighteenth year, (or in figures) 10 (and) 8, on the thirteenth lunar day of the bright fortnight of the month Jyêshtha.

See also
Indian inscriptions

Notes

External links
British Library
Location of site according to Geolysis
 British Museum Research Project : Politics, Ritual and Religion : Epigraphic Findspots

Vākāṭaka inscriptions
Sanskrit inscriptions in India
5th-century inscriptions